The Metro ExpressLanes project is a transport project in Los Angeles County, California that debuted in 2012 to "improve traffic flow and provide enhanced travel options on I-10 and I-110 in Los Angeles County". It includes a range of infrastructure developments on the Harbor Transitway and the El Monte Busway. The existing high-occupancy lanes on these transitways were converted to high occupancy toll (HOT) lanes. Associated works included a major upgrade to El Monte bus station, expansion of Metrolink's Pomona Station, the creation of a new transit station at Union Station and increased park and ride capacity and bike lockers at many transit stations. In addition, new vanpool vehicles and buses will be purchased. The project was delivered by the Los Angeles County Metropolitan Transportation Authority, the California Department of Transportation, and others. The budget was $290 million and construction, which began in 2011, was completed in February 2013. Some transit improvements for the Metro Silver Line are still being worked on.

Project elements
The Metro ExpressLanes project includes:
 Conversion of the El Monte Busway on Interstate 10 between Interstate 605 and Alameda Street (near Union Station) in Downtown Los Angeles to high-occupancy toll lanes
 Conversion of the Harbor Transitway on Interstate 110 between Harbor Gateway Transit Center and Adams Blvd in Downtown Los Angeles to high occupancy toll lanes
 Implementation of the Metro Silver Line
 Enhanced bus priority system at traffic signals in Downtown Los Angeles
 59 new alternative fuel buses
 Operating subsidy during a demonstration period
 Renovation and expansion of El Monte Station, a large regional bus station
 A new busway station on the El Monte Busway for Union Station
 Upgrades to Harbor Transitway Park & Ride lots
 Expansion of Metrolink's Pomona–North station
 More bicycle lockers at the Harbor Gateway Transit Center
 New Bus Maintenance Facility in Downtown Los Angeles
 100 New Metro Vanpools
 Implment Express Park in Downtown Los Angeles, an intelligent parking system allowing demand-based pricing and real-time space availability information

Gallery

References

External links

Los Angeles County Congestion Reduction Demonstration National Evaluation Plan — (U.S. Department of Transportation)

Project
Bus rapid transit in California